Ohi Dam is an earthfill dam located in Fukuoka Prefecture in Japan. The dam is used for irrigation. The catchment area of the dam is 4.2 km2. The dam impounds about 18  ha of land when full and can store 1252 thousand cubic meters of water. The construction of the dam was started on 1977 and completed in 1978.

References

Dams in Fukuoka Prefecture
1978 establishments in Japan